José Daniel Rincón Quintana (born 4 December 1975) is a Colombian former professional road cyclist. He is the younger brother of Oliverio Rincón.

Major results

2001
 1st  Road race, National Road Championships
 1st Overall Clasica Alcaldía de Pasca
2002
 1st  Road race, Pan American Road Championships
 1st Overall Clásica de Fusagasugá
 2nd Overall Clásico RCN
1st Stage 3
2003
 4th Overall Vuelta a Colombia
1st Stage 4
2005
 1st Stage 8 Vuelta a Colombia
 2nd Overall Vuelta al Tolima
2006
 2nd Overall Vuelta a Colombia
1st Stage 10 (TTT)
 1st Overall Clásica Club Deportivo Boyacá
1st Stage 1
2007
 1st  Overall Vuelta a Cundinamarca
1st Stages 2 & 3
 1st Overall Clásica Club Deportivo Boyacá
 1st Stage 1 Vuelta a Boyacà
2008
 1st Overall Clásica Club Deportivo Boyacá
1st Prologue & Stage 3
 1st Overall Clásica Nacional Marco Fidel Suárez
1st Stage 4
 1st Stage 1 Vuelta a Boyacà
 1st Stage 2 Clasica de Guarné
2009
 1st Overall Clasica Alcaldía de Pasca
1st Prologue
 1st Stage 2 Vuelta a Cundinamarca
 3rd Overall Clásica de Rionegro
2010
 1st Stage 4 Doble Sucre Potosí GP Cemento Fancesa
 2nd Overall Vuelta Mexico Telmex
2012
 7th Overall Vuelta Ciclista de Chile

References
 

1975 births
Living people
Colombian male cyclists
Vuelta a Colombia stage winners
Sportspeople from Boyacá Department
21st-century Colombian people